Leslie Frederick 'Bunny' Abbott OAM (1915–2011) was an Australian rugby league footballer who played in the 1930s.

Career
Les "Bunny' Abbott was graded in 1935 in Third Grade. The following season he played every First Grade season game and looked to have a long future with St. George, unfortunately in the 1937 season, he was dogged with injury and he retired. He was later to help organise and establish rugby league in Lithgow, New South Wales at the St. Pat's Club.

Honours
Abbott was awarded the Medal of the Order Of Australia (OAM)  in 2008 for his service to the community of Lithgow, New South Wales, particularly in Rugby League Football as a player, coach, referee, official and timekeeper. 

Abbott was the elder brother of the ex-NSW Police Commissioner Cec Abbott.

Death
'Bunny' Abbott died on  12 June 2011 at Lithgow District Hospital. Age 95.

References

1915 births
2011 deaths
St. George Dragons players
Rugby league players from Sydney
Rugby league wingers
Australian rugby league players
Recipients of the Medal of the Order of Australia